Santa Cruz da Conceição is a municipality in the state of São Paulo in Brazil. The population in 2020 was 4,544 and the area is 149.87 km². The elevation is 645 m.

References

Municipalities in São Paulo (state)